Tsawwassen Ferry Terminal, as part of the BC Ferries system and of Highway 17, is a major transportation facility in Delta, British Columbia, positioned less than  from the 49th parallel along the Canada–United States border. It is located at the southwestern end of a  artificial causeway that juts out into the Strait of Georgia off the mainland at the community of Tsawwassen.

History

In the late 1950s, the search for a mainland ferry terminal that would connect British Columbia's Lower Mainland with the Victoria area on Vancouver Island involved extensive scouting of locations, from Steveston to White Rock. Despite concerns of rough seas and bad weather, the favoured site soon became the area offshore from the Tsawwassen First Nation Reserve.

Construction of the terminal began in 1959, after provincial transportation Minister Phil Gaglardi, on divided engineering advice, selected the site. Construction of an artificial island began, and the causeway was built from the island back towards the mainland. This endeavour used an estimated   of boulder, rock, and gravel fill.

To connect Highway 99 to the new terminal, an  highway was constructed near the southern end of the Deas Tunnel and through the edge of Ladner. This became a portion of Highway 17. The terminal opened on June 15, 1960.

In the mid-1990s, a major renovation and expansion of the terminal was undertaken.

Issues 
The isolated causeway location of the terminal, while criticized locally in its formative years, has allowed and continues to allow terminal expansion to cope with growing vehicle traffic.

In 2003, the Tsawwassen First Nation filed legal action in the BC Supreme Court over the destruction of the foreshore and other concerns caused by the impact of the terminal and the nearby Roberts Bank Superport. Concerns were also expressed in 2005 about eutrophication, or a destructive bacterial buildup in the waters between the terminal and the Roberts Bank facility.

Ferry facilities and connections 
Currently, there are five berths at the Tsawwassen Ferry Terminal. The terminal primarily serves routes travelling to the Swartz Bay ferry terminal, north of Victoria, and the southern Gulf Islands.

On May 1, 1990, a connection from Tsawwassen to Nanaimo called the "Mid-Island Express" was established, providing the fastest surface connection between Northern Vancouver Island and the border with the United States at Blaine, and, since the opening of the South Fraser Perimeter Road, to the Fraser Valley and points east. The route ran to Departure Bay until 1997, when the Duke Point ferry terminal opened.

The terminal is served by public transportation through TransLink's 620 bus route.

See also

 Duke Point ferry terminal
 Departure Bay ferry terminal
 Horseshoe Bay ferry terminal
 Earls Cove ferry terminal
 Roberts Bank
 Roberts Bank Superport

Notes

References

BC Ferries
Buildings and structures in Delta, British Columbia
Transport in Delta, British Columbia
Ferry terminals in British Columbia